Joseph Patrick Joyce (born 18 March 1961) is an English former footballer who made 479 appearances in the Football League playing for Barnsley, Scunthorpe United, Carlisle United and Darlington. He played as a right back. He was appointed Academy Director at Newcastle United in 2006.

Playing career
Born in Consett, County Durham, Joyce made more than 350 appearances for Barnsley, where he began his career. He later played for Scunthorpe United and Carlisle United and had a brief loan spell at Darlington.

Coaching career
Joyce began his coaching career with Carlisle United, and was assistant manager of the club under Mervyn Day until 1997. He went on to become Head of Coaching with the Professional Footballers' Association, and was appointed Academy Director at Newcastle United in 2006.

References

External links
 

1961 births
Living people
Sportspeople from Consett
Footballers from County Durham
English footballers
Association football defenders
Barnsley F.C. players
Scunthorpe United F.C. players
Carlisle United F.C. players
Darlington F.C. players
Carlisle United F.C. non-playing staff
Newcastle United F.C. non-playing staff